The 1500 metres at the World Championships in Athletics has been contested by both men and women since the inaugural edition in 1983. It is the second most prestigious title in the discipline after the 1500 metres at the Olympics. The competition format typically has two qualifying rounds leading to a final between twelve athletes. It is one of two middle-distance running events on the programme, alongside the World Championship 800 metres.

The championship records for the event are 3:27.65 minute for men, set by Hicham El Guerrouj in 1999, and 3:58.52 minutes for women, set by Tatyana Tomashova in 2003. The world record has never been broken or equalled at the competition by either men or women, reflecting the lack of pacemaking and athletes' more tactical approach to championship races.

Hicham El Guerrouj of Morocco is the most successful athlete of the event through his four straight wins from 1997 to 2003, as well as a silver in 1995. Algeria's Noureddine Morceli is the next most successful athlete, with three gold medals. Two-time champion Hassiba Boulmerka of Algeria is the only woman to have won three medals. Rashid Ramzi is the only athlete to have won both middle-distance titles, having done an 800 m/1500 m double at the 2005 World Championships in Athletics. The first two women's champions Mary Decker and Tatyana Dorovskikh both completed 1500 m/3000 m World Championships doubles, while Bernard Lagat completed a 1500 m/5000 metres double at the 2007 World Championships. British runners Steve Cram, the inaugural men's winner, and 2022 champion Jake Wightman, are the only non-African-born men to win the World Championship event.

Algeria is the most successful nation in the discipline, having won five gold medals across the men's and women's event. Morocco and Bahrain each have won four gold medals, while Russia and the United States each have three. The United States has the highest total of medals in the events at twelve, with six in both in the men's and women's divisions. Kenya has the highest number of medals in the men's event, with a total of seven.

Two medallists have been stripped of their honours in the event due to doping: 1987 bronze medallist Sandra Gasser and 2007 silver medallist Yelena Soboleva.

Age

All information from IAAF

 The exact date of birth of the youngest male participant, Yahye Abdi Gurre, is unknown but he remains the youngest given his known year of birth and calculating from 1 January of that year.

Doping
The 1500 m was the event that first saw the disqualification of a World Championships medallist on the grounds of doping. The 1987 women's bronze medallist Sandra Gasser gave a positive test for anabolic steroids at the competition and received a two-year ban from the sport later that month. Twelve years passed without incident in the event, until the disqualification of the first male 1500 m athlete in 1999: Ibrahim Mohamed Aden was disqualified and given a public warning for ephedrine usage due to failing his post-race test after the semi-finals.

The 2003 men's finalist Fouad Chouki was banned for two-years after a positive test for EPO. Chouki lost an appeal at the Court of Arbitration for Sport in which he claimed that an unknown person had injected him with EPO in the aftermath of the race. Regina Jacobs (a two-time silver medallist) had her 2003 semi-final performance annulled retrospectively following the BALCO scandal, as later analysis of her sample at the 2003 USA Outdoor Track and Field Championships showed usage of the novel steroid THG.

The women's World Championships 1500 m was affected by doping for three straight editions starting from 2007. Russia's Yelena Soboleva became the second athlete to be stripped of a 1500 m medal after she was banned for her involvement in a doping test manipulation scheme, alongside 2007 finalist Yuliya Fomenko and two-time world champion Tatyana Tomashova (who did not compete in 2007 and whose gold medals from 2003 and 2005 still stand). In 2009 Mariem Alaoui Selsouli withdrew from the final after a sample given earlier that year tested positive for EPO while heats runner Alemitu Bekele Degfa was banned due to biological passport abnormalities. Ukrainian duo Anzhelika Shevchenko and Nataliya Tobias had their 2011 results annulled while Olesya Syreva became the third Russian 1500 m to be disqualified for doping.

Bernard Lagat, the men's gold medallist in 2007, had a positive "A" sample test for EPO prior to the 2003 World Championships which was disregarded after the "B" sample (taken at the same time) returned a negative result. He was temporarily banned in the interim period of testing and missed the world championships as a result, having been runner-up two years earlier. Lagat and medical advisor Hans Heid were critical of the testing procedure for EPO and advocated the dropping of the technique until more reliable methods were found.

Outside of the competition, the 2005 men's champion Rashid Ramzi was banned for doping after winning at the 2008 Beijing Olympics. Inaugural women's champion Mary Decker was banned for doping later in her career, as were 2003 and 2005 runners-up Süreyya Ayhan and Olga Yegorova.

Medalists

Men

Multiple medalists

Medalists by country

Women

Multiple medalists

Medalists by country

Championship record progression

Men

Women

References

Bibliography

External links
Official IAAF website

 
World Championships in Athletics 1500 metres
Events at the World Athletics Championships